Nourhan Muhammad Mahmud Amer (born 10 May 1993) is an Egyptian sports shooter. She competed in the Women's 10 metre air rifle event at the 2012 Summer Olympics.

References

External links
 

1993 births
Living people
Egyptian female sport shooters
Olympic shooters of Egypt
Shooters at the 2012 Summer Olympics